Goff's southeastern pocket gopher (Geomys pinetis goffi) was a pocket gopher endemic to Brevard County, Florida, United States. The last sightings recorded were in 1955. They burrowed and lived mostly underground eating mainly underground vegetation. Their habitat was temperate desert and sandy coastline. Due to human population growth and development of its habitat, this gopher is now extinct.

References
 https://web.archive.org/web/20120717000152/http://extinctanimals.petermaas.nl/

Extinct animals of the United States
Extinct rodents
Geomys
Rodent extinctions since 1500
Species made extinct by human activities